Nosema may refer to:
 Nosema (microsporidian), a fungus genus in the division Microsporidia
 Nosema (plant), a plant genus in the family Lamiaceae